The 2018–19 Greek Football Cup was the 77th season of the Greek Football Cup. A total of 73 clubs were accepted to enter, 16 from the Super League, 16 from the Football League and the 41 previous season local FCA Cup Winners. PAOK won the competition for third consecutive year beating AEK Athens 1–0 in the final held at the Olympic Stadium.

Teams

Calendar

Participating clubs

Qualifying rounds

First round
The draw for this round took place on 13 August 2018. 12 teams out of the original 53 did not participate in the draw. The majority of the games were held on 26 August 2018, with the exception of matches 12 and 16, which took place on 2 September.

Megas Alexandros Trikala advanced on walkover.

Summary

|colspan="3" style="background-color:#D0D0D0" align=center|26 August 2018

|-
|colspan="3" style="background-color:#D0D0D0" align=center|2 September 2018

|}

Matches

Second round
The draw for this round took place on 27 August 2018. All Games were held between 5-12 September 2018.

AO Kardia, Apollon Paralimnio, Aris Avato, Niki Volos, Tilikratis, O.F. Ierapetra, Ermionida, Korinthos 2006, Thyella Kamari, Ethnikos Piraeus and PAS Cithaeron Kaparelli advanced on walkover.

Summary

|colspan="3" style="background-color:#D0D0D0" align=center|5 September 2018

|-
|colspan="3" style="background-color:#D0D0D0" align=center|9 September 2018

|-
|colspan="3" style="background-color:#D0D0D0" align=center|12 September 2018

|}

Matches

Third round
The draw for this round took place on 7 September 2018.

A total of 32 teams were involved in the Round 3 draw: The 16 2018−19 Football League teams that entered in this round, and the sixteen winners of the previous round.
16 single-match fixtures were determined, of which the winners qualified to the competition Group Stage. All Games were held between 15 and 16 September 2018.

Summary

|colspan="3" style="background-color:#D0D0D0" align=center|15 September 2018

|-
|colspan="3" style="background-color:#D0D0D0" align=center|16 September 2018

|}

Matches

Group stage

The draw for the group stage was held on 18 September 2018, 12:00 EEST, at the headquarters of the Hellenic Football Federation in Goudi, Athens. The 32 teams were drawn into eight groups of four. For the draw, the teams were seeded into four pots based on the following principles:
Pot 1 contained the clubs finishing 1st through 8th in the Super League . 
Pot 1 contained the clubs finishing 9th through 14th in the Super League , along with the two cubs promoted from the Football League. 
Pot 3 and 4 contained the remaining teams, seeded based on their current league and placement during the 2017−18 season

Teams in each group will play one another in a round-robin basis, with the top two teams of each group advancing to the knockout stage. Match-day 1 matches will be held between 25-27 September, Match-day 2 matches will be held between 30 October and 1 November, while Match-day 3 will be held between 4-6 December 2018.

Seeding

Group A

Group B

Group C

Group D

Group E

Group F

Group G

Group H

Knockout phase
Each tie in the knockout phase, apart from the final, was played over two legs, with each team playing one leg at home. The team that scored more goals on aggregate over the two legs advanced to the next round. If the aggregate score was level, the away goals rule was applied, i.e. the team that scored more goals away from home over the two legs advanced. If away goals were also equal, then extra time was played. The away goals rule was again applied after extra time, i.e. if there were goals scored during extra time and the aggregate score was still level, the visiting team advanced by virtue of more away goals scored. If no goals were scored during extra time, the winners were decided by a penalty shoot-out. In the final, which were played as a single match, if the score was level at the end of normal time, extra time was played, followed by a penalty shoot-out if the score was still level.The mechanism of the draws for each round is as follows:
In the draw for the round of 16, the eight group winners are seeded, and the eight group runners-up are unseeded.The seeded teams are drawn against the unseeded teams, with the seeded teams hosting the second leg.
In the draws for the quarter-finals onwards, there are no seedings, and teams from the same group can be drawn against each other.

Bracket

Round of 16
The draw for this round took place on 21 December 2018.

Seeding

Summary

|}

Matches

Lamia won 4–2 on penalties.

Olympiacos won 3–1 on aggregate.

PAOK won 6–2 on aggregate.

Atromitos won 5–1 on aggregate.

Ergotelis won 4–3 on penalties.

AEK Athens won 6–1 on aggregate.

Asteras Tripolis won 7–6 on aggregate.

Panionios won 2–0 on aggregate.

Quarter-finals
The draw for this round took place on 25 January 2019.

Summary

|}

Matches

PAOK won 5–4 on aggregate.

AEK Athens won 4–0 on aggregate.

Asteras Tripolis won 5–1 on aggregate.

Lamia won 4–3 on aggregate.

Semi-finals

Summary
The draw for this round took place on 8 March 2019.

|}

Matches

AEK Athens won 6–0 on aggregate.

PAOK won 2–0 on aggregate.

Final

References

Cup
Greek Football Cup seasons
Greece